Unitán is an Argentine company producing quebracho tannins. Its production amounts to 40.000 tonnes of tannins sold to the tanning industry, the drilling industry, for the enological applications and as animal food.

Unitan possesses a production plant located in Puerto Tirol, Chaco Province

References

External links
 Information on quebracho tannins on Argentine company Unitan's website

Manufacturing companies based in Buenos Aires